Santa María Chiquimula is a town, with a population of 15,919 (2018 census), and a municipality in the Totonicapán department of Guatemala. Located in the western highlands of Guatemala at an altitude of 2130 metres. The Mayan Kʼicheʼ language is spoken among the indigenous people here, but Spanish is also widely spoken. The main products of the region are corn and black beans.

Dialect

The Kʼicheʼ spoken in Santa María Chiquimula is marked by intervocalic  transitioning into , especially among women.

References

External links
 

Municipalities of the Totonicapán Department